Helen Szamuely (June 25, 1950 – April 5, 2017) was a historian and Eurosceptic who was a researcher for the Bruges Group and founder of the Anti-Federalist League. After the Maastricht Treaty was signed in 1992, she organised monthly meetings at the Red Lion near Parliament to discuss Europe.

Early life
Szamuely was born in Moscow, daughter of Hungarian Tibor Szamuely and Russian Nina (née Orlova, 1923-1974), both academics. The family moved to Ghana in 1963, where her father taught until they moved to Britain the next year, settling in West London. Szamuely was educated at a Willesden grammar school, then did her A-levels at St Paul's Girls' School before attending the University of Leeds in 1970 to read History and Russian, in which she took a First. She was a research student at St Antony's College, Oxford, from 1975 to 1979, and in 1984 was awarded D.Phil. for her thesis "British Attitudes to Russia 1880-1918".

Career
A prolific writer and translator, Szamuely had articles published in literary and political journals, contributed to The Reader's Companion to Twentieth Century Writers, and was an interviewer and scriptwriter for the BBC Russian Service. She was a Research Fellow at the Centre for Research into Post-Communist Economies from 1997 to 2017. For many years Szamuely was a researcher and political brief writer in the House of Lords, working with peers on EU issues regarding Russia and Turkey. She was a campaigner for release of political prisoners in the Soviet Union, including the poet Nizametdin Akhmetov, whose work she translated.

Personal life
Szamuely had a daughter, Katharine, of whose father "she never spoke".

Publications 
Her articles on history and politics have appeared in publications including History Today, Standpoint, New Statesman, Guardian, Salisbury Review, EUobserver. She wrote reviews of detective stories for the Social Affairs Unit. She ran her own blogs Your Freedom and Ours, Conservative History Journal and Fisheries - Truth and Fiction and wrote for other blogs including London Historians.

Publications include:
 A "Coming Home" Or Poisoned Chalice? - Helen Szamuely, Bill Jamieson
Alien Thoughts: Reflections on Identity - Helen Szamuely, Robert W. Cahn, Yahya El-Droubie
A Delayed Homecoming: An Update on European Union Enlargement - Helen Szamuely
Samizdat: Based on a Discussion at the CRCE - Dennis O'Keefe, Helen Szamuely
"What if Lenin's 'sealed' train had not reached Petrograd in 1917?" in Prime Minister Portillo and other things that never happened - edited by Duncan Brack and Iain Dale
"What if Czechoslovakia had fought in 1938?" in President Gore and other things that never happened - edited by Duncan Brack

Translations include:

 Moving the Mountain: Inside the Perestroika Revolution - Abel Aganbegyan translated by Helen Szamuely from Russian to English
 Choices and Decisions: A Life - Éva Haraszti-Taylor translated by Helen Szamuely from Hungarian to English

References

1950 births
2017 deaths
Alumni of the University of Leeds
British Eurosceptics